Maia McCall Mitchell (born 18 August 1993) is an Australian actress and singer. She is known for her roles as Brittany Flune in the children's television series Mortified for the Nine Network, and as Natasha Ham in the Seven Network's teen drama Trapped. For American audiences, she played the role of Callie Adams Foster in the Freeform drama The Fosters (2013–18) and its spin-off series Good Trouble (2019–22). She also co-starred with Ross Lynch in the Disney Channel original films Teen Beach Movie (2013) and Teen Beach 2 (2015) as McKenzie/Mack.

Early life
Mitchell was born in Lismore, New South Wales. Her father, Alex, is a taxi driver while her mother, Jill, works in the education system. Mitchell has one younger brother, Charlie. She plays guitar, which has been demonstrated in her film and television work. She learned to play at a young age. She attended Trinity Catholic College, Lismore.

Career

2000s: Australian television debut
Mitchell first began acting by performing in school plays and also in local theatre productions. She was discovered by talent agencies and got her big break at age 12, when she was cast as Brittany Flune in the Australian children's television series Mortified. Mortified ended after two seasons and a total of 26 episodes, which ran from 30 June 2006 to 11 April 2007. Due to her success on Mortified, she also starred in the Australian TV series Trapped and its sequel series Castaway as the character Natasha Hamilton. She was also in the TV series K-9, a spin-off of the popular British TV series Doctor Who which focuses on the robot dog K9.

2010s: Breakthrough and American television
Her first television role in the U.S. was in the Disney Channel TV series Jessie. She then made her film debut by starring as the main character McKenzie/Mack in the Disney Channel original movie Teen Beach Movie and reprising her role in Teen Beach 2. From 2013 to 2018 she starred in the ABC Family later Freeform drama series The Fosters as Callie Jacob, who would later change names to Callie Adams Foster. During the show's fifth and last season, it was announced that Mitchell and Cierra Ramirez would be spun off into their own series, titled Good Trouble which premiered in January 2019. She starred for over three seasons, leaving the series in the fourth season's second episode, as Mitchell chose to move back home to Australia.

Also in 2018, she collaborated with her boyfriend Rudy Mancuso for the song "Magic".

Personal life
In 2022, Mitchell announced that she had permanently moved back to her native Lismore, Australia, to be with her family amidst the COVID-19 pandemic and the 2022 Australian flood crisis.

Filmography

Film

Television

Web

Music videos

Discography

Soundtrack albums

Charted songs

Awards and nominations

References

External links

 
 
 
 

1993 births
21st-century Australian actresses
Actresses from New South Wales
Australian child actresses
Australian expatriate actresses in the United States
Australian women singers
Australian film actresses
Australian television actresses
Australian voice actresses
Living people
People from Lismore, New South Wales
Singers from New South Wales
Walt Disney Records artists